Belhadj or Belhaj may refer to:

 Abdelhakim Belhadj (1966-), the emir of the Libyan Islamic Fighting Group
 Ahlem Belhadj (1964-2023), Tunisian psychiatrist and activist
 Ali Belhadj (1956-), Vice-President of the Islamic Salvation Front in Algeria
  (1960-), Moroccan politician
 Nadir Belhadj (b. 1982), footballer